The slaty-backed hemispingus (Poospiza goeringi) is a species of bird in the family Thraupidae that is endemic to Venezuela.

Its natural habitat is subtropical or tropical moist montane forests. It is threatened by habitat loss.

References

slaty-backed hemispingus
Birds of the Venezuelan Andes
Endemic birds of Venezuela
slaty-backed hemispingus
slaty-backed hemispingus
slaty-backed hemispingus
Taxonomy articles created by Polbot